Firuzabad-e Sofla (also Romanized as Fīrūzābād-e Soflá; also known as Fīrūzābād-e Pā’īn and Fīrūzābād Pā’īn) is a village in Khezel-e Sharqi Rural District, Khezel District, Nahavand County, Hamadan Province, Iran. At the 2006 census, its population was 262, in 66 families.

References 

Populated places in Nahavand County